Close Calls with Brick Walls is the third studio album by American musician Andrew W.K. It was originally released through Universal Records in July 2006 in Japan with an exclusive bonus DVD and in Korea with four exclusive bonus tracks, before finally being released to the rest of the world on CD in 2010.

Production
The album marked a major change in sound, abandoning the "wall of sound" heard on earlier albums for a more traditional rock sound, and with Andrew's vocals sung rather than screamed. Songs of more experimental nature were also featured on this album. The album received a wide array of reactions from fans and critics.

A video was released for "Not Going to Bed" in Japan upon the album's release, and an animated video for "I Want to See You Go Wild" was released in June 2010, to support the re-released 2-disc edition. A music video for "I'm a Vagabond" (from the Mother of Mankind rarities album) was also released.

Legal disputes
Due to legal disputes regarding the ownership of the name "Andrew W.K.", Close Calls with Brick Walls was initially only released in Japan and Korea. On August 18, 2007 it was given a limited release in America only on vinyl on Load Records with 5 exclusive bonus tracks, but only became widely available on CD to the rest of the world in March 2010, bundled with a second disc containing a collection of rare and unreleased songs entitled Mother of Mankind.

In September 2009, writing in the British newspaper, The Guardian, Andrew W.K. acknowledged legal disputes around his name: "At the end of 2004, an old friend of mine got in some business trouble and basically decided to take it out on me. To cut a long story short, this person is someone I worked very closely with and had a formal and family business relationship with. Due to various complaints this person had with me, they were able to turn my life and career upside down. I wasn't allowed to use my own name within certain areas of the US entertainment industry and we were in a debate about who owned the rights to my image, and who should get credit for 'inventing' it. This made my life complicated and intense for a few years, but I kept working and doing whatever I could to keep moving forward."

Track listing

Original release

2010 release

Notes 
Track origins:
 Track 1: Premium Collection - The Very Best So Far (aka "Party (You Shout!)")
 Tracks 3, 11, 15, 19: Close Calls With Brick Walls (Korean edition)
 Track 4: Spit 7" with Riverboat Gamblers
 Track 6: I'm A Vagabond 7" Single
 Tracks 7, 8, 12, 17: Close Calls With Brick Walls (Vinyl edition) ("We're Not Gunna Get Old" is slightly edited, the version on the vinyl ended with a capella vocals which lasted for a few seconds more)
 Track 9: background music from the film Who Knows? Live In Concert: 2000 - 2004
 Track 13: new version of a track from Girls Own Juice EP
 Track 18: new version of a track featured in a promotional release from Bulb Records, commonly referred to as the "We Want Fun" unreleased LP

All other tracks were brand new at the time of the original release.

Charts

References

Andrew W.K. albums
Universal Records albums
2006 albums